Unraid is a proprietary Linux-based operating system designed to run on home media server setups that operates as a network-attached storage device, application server, and virtualization host. Unraid is proprietary software developed and maintained by Lime Technology, Inc. Users of the software are encouraged to write and use plugins and Docker applications to extend the functionality of their systems.

Features 
Unraid's primary feature is the ability to easily create and manage RAID arrays in hardware-agnostic ways, allowing users to use nearly any combination of hard drives to create an array, regardless of model, capacity, or connection type. Since Unraid saves data to individual drives rather than spreading single files out over multiple drives, users can create shares, which are groups of files that can be written to multiple drives (as determined by the user or system) and allow easy access and management by users.

Unraid also allows users to create Docker containers or virtual machines to host applications on the system. For example, a user could use a pre-made Docker container to host applications such as Plex, Jellyfin, and others.

Unraid's user license is attached to a specific USB flash drive, which may be linked to a user's forum account.

Technical specifications 
Unraid is based on Linux Slackware.
Supported filesystems: XFS, Btrfs and ReiserFS. ReiserFS is only for legacy reasons and for backward compatibility,  and as a main-rule, shouldn't be used on new implementations.

Unraid doesn't use RAID, that is it doesn't stripe data over all disks in the array, instead, it creates data redundancy by using parity drive(s).

References

Operating systems based on the Linux kernel
Proprietary operating systems
RAID